Emil Hammacher (21.03.1885, Köln — 1916, killed in France) was a German philosopher, proponent of objective idealism and mystic, doctor of Philosophy and Law, professor of philosophy at the University of Bonn.

He studied in Geneva, Heidelberg, Berlin and Bonn. Hammacher borrowed the basic tenets of objective idealism from Hegel. He rejected dialectics and developed the mystical doctrine of "ethical self-awareness of the spirit" as "the supreme and fundamental value." In his work directed against Marxism, Hammacher holds the idea that the socialization of the means of production and materialism are contrary to the laws of morality.

Works

Books
 Der Charakter der Notstandshandlung vom rechtsphilosophischen und legislativen Standpunkte. Diss. Leipzig 1907 
 Die philosophischen Entwicklungsbedingungen des Marxismus, Bonn, 1908;
 Das philosophisch-ökonomische System des Marxismus, Lpz., 1909; 
 Die Bedeutung der Philosophie Hegels für die Gegenwart. Lpz., 1911 ; 
 Hauptfragen der modernen Kultur. Lpz.—B., 1914.

Articles
 Zur Würdigung des "wahren" Sozialismus. in: Archiv für die Geschichte des Sozialismus und der Arbeiterbewegung / Hrsg. Carl Grünberg. - Leipzig, 1 (1911), p. 41-100

References

20th-century German philosophers
20th-century mystics
20th-century German writers
1885 births
1916 deaths
German military personnel killed in World War I